Bạch Thông is a rural district of Bắc Kạn province in the Northeast region of Vietnam. As of 2003 the district had a population of 31,585. The district covers an area of 546 km². The district capital lies at Phủ Thông.

Administrative divisions
The district is divided into one township (the capital Phủ Thông) and communes:

Phương Linh
Vi Hương
Tú Trĩ
Lục Bình
Đôn Phong
Dương Phong
Quang Thuận
Hà Vị
Quân Bình
Cẩm Giàng
Tân Tiến
Sĩ Bình
Vũ Muộn
Cao Sơn
Nguyên Phúc
Mỹ Thanh

References

Districts of Bắc Kạn province